IF3 or IF3 may refer to:

 IF3 International Freeski Film Festival
 Iodine trifluoride, IF3
 PIF-3 or prokaryotic initiation factor 3
 Translation initiation factor IF-3